Specklinia barbae is a species of orchid plant native to Costa Rica.

References 

barbae
Flora of Costa Rica
Plants described in 1923